Dominique Lefèbvre (1810–1865) was a French missionary of the Paris Foreign Missions Society, Bishop of Isauropolis in partibus infidelium, and Vicar Apostolic in Vietnam during the 19th century. His two terms of imprisonment in Vietnam were a pretext for the first French naval interventions in the country.

Dominique Lefèbvre arrived in Vietnam in 1835. At the time, it was illegal for missionaries to enter the country to proselytise. In 1845 Lefèbvre was condemned to death. The US Captain John Percival of the USS Constitution failed in his attempts to have him released, but managed to inform Admiral Jean-Baptiste Cécille who obtained his release.

Later Dominique Lefèbvre again re-entered Vietnam, and was again imprisoned. In 1847, Cécille sent two warships (Gloire and Victorieuse) under Captains Lapierre and Charles Rigault de Genouilly to Danang (Tourane) in Vietnam to obtain the liberation of two imprisoned French missionaries, Bishop Dominique Lefèbvre (imprisoned for a second time as he had re-entered Vietnam secretly) and Duclos, and freedom of worship for Catholics in Vietnam. As negotiations drew on without results, on April 15, 1847 a fight named the Bombardment of Đà Nẵng erupted between the French fleet and Vietnamese ships, three of them being sunk as a result. The French fleet then sailed away.

Dominique Lefèbvre died in Marseilles in 1865.

See also
France-Vietnam relations

Notes

1810 births
1865 deaths
Paris Foreign Missions Society missionaries
Roman Catholic missionaries in Vietnam
1847 in Vietnam
1865 in Vietnam
France–Vietnam relations
French people imprisoned abroad
French prisoners sentenced to death
Prisoners sentenced to death by Vietnam